Qaleh-ye Mohammad Ali (also Romanized as Qal‘eh-ye Moḩammad ‘Alī and Qal‘eh Moḩammad ‘Alī; also known as Qal‘eh-ye Bolandī) is a village in Arudan Rural District, in the Central District of Mohr County, Fars Province, Iran. At the 2006 census, its population was 1,234, in 238 families.

References 

Populated places in Mohr County